Nyctemera dauila is a moth of the family Erebidae. The species is found on Goodenough Island.

The length of the forewings is 21–22 mm. The forewings are dark brown, the basal half with faded white veins. The wingfold and longitudinal line in the cell are white. The fascia are narrow and are crossed by dark brown veins. The hindwings have a dark brown hindmargin.

Etymology
The species name refers to the local and old name of Goodenough Island, Dauila.

References

Nyctemerina
Moths described in 2007